Rush It is a 1978 American romantic drama film co-written and directed by Gary Youngman. The directorial debut film also featured the first acting role in a film by Tom Berenger.

Premise
A female bicycle messenger is looking for love in New York City.

Principal cast

See also
 Quicksilver

References

External links 

1978 films
1978 romantic drama films
Cycling films
American independent films
American romantic drama films
Films set in New York City
Films shot in New York City
1978 directorial debut films
1978 independent films
1970s English-language films
1970s American films